Bagnaia is a village in Lazio, central Italy, administratively a frazione of the comune of Viterbo, province of Viterbo.

Former municipality, it was annexed to the comune of Viterbo in 1928. Bagnaia is about 7 km from Viterbo and 100 km from Rome.

Main sights
San Giovanni Battista, parish church built in the late 16th century, it was entirely restructured in 1753 by cardinal Federico Marcello Lante
Sant'Antonio Abate
Castle of Bagnaia
Villa Lante, built between 1566 and 1588 and commissioned by cardinal Giovanni Francesco Gambara

References 

Frazioni of the Province of Viterbo
Viterbo